San Benito may refer to:

Places

Mexico and Central America
 San Benito, Petén, Guatemala
 San Benito, a community in Tipitapa, Nicaragua
 Islas San Benito, an island off the west coast of Baja California, Mexico

Philippines
 San Benito, Surigao del Norte, a municipality
 San Benito, a barangay in Dagami, Leyte

South America
 San Benito, Cochabamba, Bolivia
 San Benito, Santander, Colombia
 San Benito District, a district in Contumazá province, Peru
 San Benito, Peru, capital of the district

United States
 San Benito, California
 San Benito County, California
 San Benito AVA, a wine region in San Benito County, California
 San Benito, Texas

Other uses
 San Benito de Palermo, a saint in the Catholic church
 San Benito el Real, Valladolid, a church and former Benedictine monastery in Spain
 Sanbenito, a penitential garment during the time of the Spanish Inquisition

See also
 Benedict (disambiguation), for saints called San Benito in some languages